The Armistice of Villa Giusti or Padua Armistice was armistice convention with Austria-Hungary  which de facto ended warfare between Allies and Associated Powers and Austria-Hungary  during World War I. Allies and Associated Powers were represented by Italy. The armistice protocol togheter with supplementary protocol was signed on 3 November 1918 in the Villa Giusti, outside Padua in the Veneto, Northern Italy, and took effect 24 hours later. This armistice applied only on Austria because Hungary later signed separate Belgrade armistice.

Background
By the end of October 1918, the Austro-Hungarian Army was so fatigued that its commanders were forced to seek a ceasefire. By 1918 the Austro-Hungarian Empire was tearing itself apart under ethnic lines, and if the Dual Monarchy were to survive, it needed to withdraw from the war.

In the final stage of the Battle of Vittorio Veneto, a stalemate was reached, and the troops of Austria-Hungary started a chaotic withdrawal. On 28 October, Austria-Hungary began to negotiate a truce but hesitated to sign the text of the armistice. In the meantime, the Italians reached Trento and Udine, and landed in Trieste. After a threat to break off negotiations, the Austro-Hungarians, on 3 November, accepted the armistice.

Terms
The ceasefire would start at 15:00 on 4 November, but a unilateral order of the Austro-Hungarian High Command made its forces stop fighting on 3 November.

The armistice required Austria-Hungary's forces to evacuate not only all territory occupied since August 1914 but also South Tirol, Tarvisio, the Isonzo Valley, Gorizia, Trieste, Istria, western Carniola, and part of Dalmatia. All German forces would be expelled from Austria-Hungary within 15 days or interned, and the Allies were to have the free use of Austria-Hungary's internal communications. Austria-Hungary was also to allow the transit of the Triple Entente armies to reach Germany from the South. In November 1918, the Italian Army, with 20,000 to 22,000 soldiers, began to occupy Innsbruck and all North Tyrol.

After the war, Italy annexed Southern Tyrol (now Trentino-Alto Adige/Südtirol), according to the secret Treaty of London, as well as Trieste, Austrian Littoral and part of Dalmatia (Zadar, Lastovo, Palagruža).

Signatories

Italy
 Tenente Generale Pietro Badoglio
 Maggior Generale Scipione Scipioni
 Colonnello Tullio Marchetti
 Colonnello Pietro Gazzera
 Colonnello Pietro Maravigna
 Colonnello Alberto Pariani
 Capitano di Vascello Francesco Accinni

Austria-Hungary
 General Viktor Weber Edler von Webenau
 Oberst Karl Schneller
 Fregattenkapitän Johannes Prinz von und zu Liechtenstein
 Oberstleutnant J.V. Nyékhegyi
 Korvettenkapitän Georg Ritter von Zwierkowski
 Oberstleutnant i.G. Victor Freiherr von Seiller
 Hauptmann i.G. Camillo Ruggera

See also
 Bollettino della Vittoria, Italian General Armando Diaz's victory speech
 Treaty of Trianon, the resulting treaty

References

 Antonello Biagini, Giovanna Motta, The First World War: Analysis and Interpretation, Volume 1, p. 100
 John Gooch, The Italian Army and the First World War, p. 299
 Bullitt Lowry, Armistice 1918, p. 112
 Manfried Rauchensteiner, The First World War and the End of the Habsburg Monarchy, 1914-1918, p. 1005

External links
 Text of the armistice

Treaties concluded in 1918
Treaties entered into force in 1918
1918 in Italy
1918 in Austria-Hungary
Villa Giusti
Italy in World War I
Military history of Italy during World War I
Austria-Hungary in World War I
World War I treaties
Villa Giusti
Villa Giusti
Peace treaties of Austria
Treaties of the Kingdom of Italy (1861–1946)
 
1918 in military history
Italian front (World War I)
November 1918 events